Odyssey is a heroic fantasy, play-by-mail (PBM) game.

History and development
Odyssey was a computer moderated, play-by-mail game published by Gamer's Den. It was a heroic fantasy game.

The game's first module was Heroes' Quest, available for 30–50 players. In the July–August 1997 issue of Paper Mayhem, the publisher announced the release of its second module, Only the Strong, written by Mark Montero and available as a play-by-email (PBEM) game. It had six factions: The Realm, The Kingdom of Melborne, The League of Chaos, The Children of Scourge, The Greenskins, and The Dark Council. Novices could play the New Frontiers module. A third module was Black Piper.

Gameplay
Gameplay was extended, but with victory conditions, making it a closed-ended game. Elements of gameplay included fantasy adventure, conquest, and exploration. Factions did not appear in the first module, but Only the Strong featured six factions while Black Piper had two warring factions.

Reception
Reviewer Douglas W. Bierbower, in the January–February 1996 issue of Paper Mayhem magazine placed the game's quality over others in the genre: Alamaze, Hyborian War, Legends, Middle Earth, Olympia, and Suzerainty.

See also
 List of play-by-mail games

References

Bibliography

 
 
 
 
 
 
 

Fantasy games
Multiplayer games
Play-by-mail games